Cao Lãnh (Vietnamese for "high leader") is the capital city of Đồng Tháp Province, Vietnam.

History
During the French colonial period Cao Lãnh found some supporters for the nationalist appeal of Trần Huy Liệu's Đông Pháp Thời Báo (Indochina Times) founded in May 1923. Later, in the initial resistance to the French in 1945, the Việt Nam Quốc Dân Đảng and others in the South merged to form the Third Division of the popular army. Cao Lãnh was where the troops were reorganized into 23 units each of 500-600 men.

Prior to 1975, Cao Lãnh was the capital of Kiến Phong province, in the Mekong Delta region of South Vietnam. In February 1976, Kiến Phong was merged with Sa Đéc Province to become Đồng Tháp Province. Sa Đéc became the capital city of the new province. Cao Lãnh replaced Sa Đéc as the capital on April 24, 1994, and became a city in October 2007.

Climate

References

Populated places in Đồng Tháp province
Districts of Đồng Tháp province
Provincial capitals in Vietnam
Cities in Vietnam